George Kimball may refer to:

George E. Kimball (1906–1967), American quantum chemist
George Edward Kimball (1943–2011), American author
George Kimball (attorney), attorney in Canaan, New Hampshire who helped establish a school for African Americans